The New York City Health and Hospitals Police (NYHP) is responsible for providing on-site security services at the 18 NYC hospitals and clinics operated by the New York City Health and Hospitals Corporation (HHC) and to enforce state and city laws at those facilities.

The New York City Police Department respond to all incidents that occur at NYC Health and Hospital facilities. They are the primary policing and investigation agency within New York City as per the city charter.

History 
New York City Health and Hospitals Corporation (HHC) special officer's provided on-site security service at the New York City-owned hospitals since the 1940s, when they were known as the City of New York Department of Hospitals security. The New York City Health and Hospitals Corporation (HHC) was established in 1965 to operate New York City public hospitals. Until 1973, HHC-operated hospitals were patrolled by both hospital security officers and police officers from the New York City Police Department.

In 1980 special officers were hired and the New York City Police Department officers were removed and the New York City Health and Hospitals Corporation were added to NYS Criminal Procedure Law 2.10 sub 40. In 2015, the city of New York department of citywide administrative service application unit added this new position (HHC special officer) to New York's civil service exam.

Ranks 
Members of New York City Health and Hospitals (Police) are hired under the civil service title as HHC special officers and are subject to advancement upon provisional or civil service appointment to the title of Supervising Special Officer (I or II). All current appointments to the rank of Captain or Higher are provisional by nature. Ranks reflect those of other law enforcement agencies and include the following:

Power and authority 
New York City Health and Hospitals Special Officer's have limited peace officer powers in connection with special duties of employment pursuant to New York State Criminal Procedure Law § 2.10(27). The exercise of these powers is limited to the employee's geographical area of employment and only while such employee is actually on duty as listed in Chapter 13 subsection (C):

Training 
New York City Health and Hospitals special officers must complete the basic peace officer training course. The current training course is twelve weeks at Jacobi hospital. The curriculum includes basic NYS criminal procedural law, penal law, powers of a peace officer, defensive tactics, radio use, arrest procedures, and first aid/CPR, pepper spray training.

NYC Health and Hospitals special officers are required to attend annual in-service training to ensure compliance with applicable provisions of the New York State's Division of Criminal Justice Services.

Equipment 
NYC Health and Hospitals special officers are prohibited by New York State Law (Criminal Procedure Law) to use or carry a firearm but do carry an expandable baton, handcuffs, a flashlight, a radio that is directly linked to other officers, and a bullet resistant vest.

Deaths in the line of duty 
Since the establishment of the New York City Health and Hospitals, one HHC special Patrolman officer has died in the line of duty.

See also 
 List of law enforcement agencies in New York
 Law enforcement in New York City
 New York City Health and Hospitals Corporation
 New York City Department of Homeless Services Police
 Security police

References

External links
 Teamsters Local 237

Law enforcement agencies of New York City
NYC Health + Hospitals
1973 establishments in New York City
Specialist police departments of New York (state)